Florinda Bolkan (born Florinda Soares Bulcão; 15 February 1941) is a retired Brazilian actress and model.

Biography
She was born in Uruburetama and lived in Fortaleza and Rio de Janeiro until she moved to Italy. A former flight inspector for Brazilian international carrier Varig, she became fluent in English, Italian and French. Bulcão moved to Italy in 1968 after being discovered by the film director Luchino Visconti. She changed her name to Florinda Bolkan because she thought it would be more comfortable for international audiences. 

Bolkan acted with the Beatle Ringo Starr in her first film, Candy. She worked in more than forty films, mainly in Italy. She was directed by Vittorio de Sica in Una Breve Vacanza. Under Elio Petri's direction, she made Investigation of a Citizen Above Suspicion. Enrico Maria Salerno directed her in Anonimo Veneziano. She worked with Jean-Louis Trintignant, John Cassavetes, and Annie Girardot.

Like Sophia Loren, Claudia Cardinale and Monica Vitti, she also won the David di Donatello award three times, the Italian equivalent of the Academy Award in Hollywood. When De Sica cast her in Una Breve Vacanza, the film that introduced her to North America, he said: "I chose you because your eyes have known hunger." She replied: "Those born in Ceará bring within themselves a strong and hard share of the real thing." 

For 20 years, Bolkan was the life partner of Countess Marina Cicogna, producer of Una Breve Vacanza.. In 2000, Bolkan debuted as director in the Brazilian film Eu Não Conhecia Tururu. Besides directing, she also plays a major character in the film. She continues to act in European films, mostly Italian films. Model Sônia Ribeiro,  Bolkan's sister, married Willy Bogner Jr. in 1972.

Filmography

Film

Television

Awards and nominations

References

External links

 Official website
 
 Florinda Bolkan at Cult Sirens

1941 births
Brazilian expatriates in Italy
Brazilian film actresses
Brazilian television actresses
David di Donatello winners
Living people
People from Ceará
Lesbian models
Brazilian lesbian actresses